Agapius (or Agapios) was a philosopher associated with Manichaeism. He is believed to have lived in the fourth or fifth century.

Identity

He is chiefly known for being mentioned in the Bibliotheca, a work by Photius, the ninth-century Patriarch of Constantinople. He is listed by Photius, as well as Peter of Sicily, as being among the twelve disciples of Mani. However, in earlier sixth-century works, such as the abjuration formula of Zacharias of Mytilene and the handbook on abjuration of heresies by Presbyter Timothy of Constantinople, he is not listed as a Manichean but merely as the author of a work entitled the Heptalogue (Heptalogus).

Photius also describes Agapius as challenging the teachings of Eunomius, who, according to Samuel N.C. Lieu, may be identified as Eunomius of Cyzicus, the Arian bishop of Cyzicus in Mysia.  Agapius, however, could not have both been a disciple of Mani, who died in 276, and have lived long enough to write against Eunomius of Cyzicus, who began as bishop in 360.

Writings

Photius described reading an unidentified work, possibly the Heptalogue, by Agapius that contained "23 fables and 102 other sections", where Agapius feigns his own Christianity but reveals himself as an "enemy" of Christ. Agapius dedicated his work of twenty-three chapters to his female fellow philosopher Urania.

Photius summarizes Agapius' apparently Manichaean teachings as follows:

Agapius, however, appears to have also endorsed ideas unrelated to Manichaeism, such as Orthodox Christian concepts like "the Trinity, the Incarnation, the Baptism, Crucifixion and Resurrection of Christ, the Resurrection of the Dead and the Last Judgment." Photius claims Agapius was able to do so by "altering and translating almost all the terms of piety and of the Christian religion into other meanings..."

Photius mentions that Agapius made use of apocryphal Christian literature, especially the Acts of Andrew, and pagan philosophy in his arguments:

Agapius is also described as an author of hymns.

References

Manichaeans